Long Ridge Road can refer to:

County Route 3 (Westchester County, New York), named Long Ridge Road
State C166, a highway in Australia named Long Ridge Road